CenterPoint Energy Tower (formerly Houston Industries Plaza) is a  tall building in downtown Houston. Designed by Richard Keating, this renovation dramatically changed the building, the Houston Skyline and the downtown. Keating was also the designer of the nearby Wells Fargo Tower. It has the headquarters of CenterPoint Energy.

Historically the building housed the headquarters of Houston Industries (HI) and subsidiary Houston Lighting & Power (HL&P). In 1999 Houston Industries changed its name to Reliant Energy.

Around 1995 the building owners added a circle-shaped canopy that is five stories tall, due to a business competitor down the street having a building taller than theirs. Clifford Pugh of the Houston Chronicle wrote that "It was meant to resemble a lantern, but at night the lit open space looks more like a hovering spaceship."

Gallery

See also 

 List of tallest buildings in Houston
 List of tallest buildings in Texas
 List of tallest buildings in the United States

References

External links

DMJM H&N Architects website

Skyscraper office buildings in Houston
Office buildings completed in 1974